Mohd Rizal bin Mohd Ghazali (born 1 October 1992), simply known as Rizal, is a Malaysian professional footballer who plays for the Malaysia Super League club Sabah and Malaysia national team as a right-back but can also play as a wing-back.

Club career

Perlis

Rizal began his career with the Perlis youth team, Perlis President Cup. Later, he was promoted to the Perlis senior team in 2011 wearing number 15 jersey. Rizal spent three seasons with Perlis senior team before signed with Kedah for the 2014 season.

Kedah Darul Aman
On 17 October 2013, Rizal signed a contract with Kedah Darul Aman to play in 2014 season. He was registered with the number 34 jersey, before switching to jersey number 15 afterwards. At the beginning of his appearances with Kedah Darul Aman, Rizal played as a winger. Somewhere in 2015, club's temporary coach, Ramon Marcote, has placed him as a right-back as Ramon feels that Rizal is better at that position. Therefore, he continues to serve as club's main right-back since then.

Rizal scored a goal in the 2016 Malaysia Cup final which both team ended tied 1–1 after extra time. Kedah won 6–5 in the shootout and clinched the Malaysia Cup for the 2016.

International career
Rizal made his first international appearance for Malaysia national team in a 0–0 draw friendly against Singapore on 7 October 2016.

Career statistics

Club

International

Honours

Club
Kedah Darul Aman
 Malaysia Premier League: 2015
 Malaysian FA Cup: 2017, 2019
 Malaysia Cup: 2016
 Malaysia Charity Shield: 2017

Individual
 Man of the Match Malaysia Cup final: 2016
 Best Defender Award: 2016

References

External links
 
 
 

1992 births
Living people
Malaysian footballers
Malaysia international footballers
Malaysia Super League players
Kedah Darul Aman F.C. players
Perlis FA players
Sabah F.C. (Malaysia) players
People from Kedah
People from Perlis
Malaysian people of Malay descent
Association football fullbacks
Footballers at the 2018 Asian Games
Asian Games competitors for Malaysia